Sota Mino (Mino Sota; born 20 October 1994), is a Japanese professional footballer who plays as a midfielder for Romanian Liga I side FC Hermannstadt.

Career

Sota Mino started his career at Lagend Shiga in Japan, then moved in Malta, where he played for Fgura United and Għargħur. In the summer of 2018, Sota signed with Romanian Liga II side Metaloglobus București, where he played for three years before signing FC Hermannstadt, club for which he made his Liga I debut.

References

External links
 
 

1994 births
People from Ōtsu, Shiga
Association football people from Shiga Prefecture
Living people
Japanese footballers
Association football midfielders
Maltese Challenge League players
Liga I players
Liga II players
FC Metaloglobus București players
FC Hermannstadt players
Japanese expatriate footballers
Japanese expatriate sportspeople in Malta
Expatriate footballers in Malta
Japanese expatriate sportspeople in Romania
Expatriate footballers in Romania